The girls' doubles luge at the 2020 Winter Youth  Olympics took place on 18 January at the St. Moritz-Celerina Olympic Bobrun.

Results
The first run was held at 11:00 and the second run at 12:00.

References

Girls' doubles